NGF may refer to:

Nerve growth factor
Naval gunfire
Northern Group of Forces
National Golf Foundation
 Non-Growing Follicles, see Folliculogenesis
North German Federation
 New Generation Fighter, see Future Combat Air System